The Plainfield Township Trail is a  rail trail in Plainfield Township, Pennsylvania. The trail extends from Stockertown (Belfast Junction) to Pen Argyl (Pen Argyl Junction). The trail follows the former Conrail railroad line which was abandoned in 1981.

External links 
 Plainfield Township Trail Map

References

Rail trails in Pennsylvania
Protected areas of Northampton County, Pennsylvania